Choose life may refer to:

Music 
 Choose Life (Sandie Shaw album), 1983
 Choose Life (Debby Boone album), 1985
 "Choose Life", Big Tent Revival song
 "Choose Life", a song by Tzant under the name of PF Project featuring Ewan McGregor, sampling the opening passage of the 1996 film Trainspotting
 Choose Life, Uvacharta Bachayim, a 2011 oratorio
 Choose Life, Uvacharta Bachayim (album)

Other
 Bible verse : "I call heaven and earth to record this day against you, that I have set before you life and death, blessing and cursing: therefore choose life, that both thou and thy seed may live."
 Anti-Suicide movement, Choosing life empathizes instead of choosing suicide, instead choose your life, and prioritize yourself when making this decision
 Choose Life, a dialogue between Buddhist leader Daisaku Ikeda and British historian Arnold J. Toynbee, and the resulting book
 CHOOSE LIFE, a message t-shirt in the 1984 music videos for Wham!'s "Wake Me Up Before You Go-Go" and Queen's "Hammer to Fall"
 Choose Life license plates, available in 32 U.S. states to express an anti-abortion message
 Choose Life, Inc., an anti-abortion organization based in Marion County, Florida